We Are Church, an international movement founded in Rome in 1996, is committed to the renewal of the Roman Catholic Church on the basis of the Second Vatican Council (1962-1965) and the theological spirit developed from it. 

We are Church evolved from the Church Referendum in Austria in 1995 that was started after the paedophilia scandal around Vienna's Cardinal Groer. We are Church is represented in more than twenty countries on all continents and is networking world-wide with similar-minded reform groups. 

As international studies of renowned religion sociologists confirm, We are Church as a reform movement within the Church represents the "voice of the people in the pews" and has demonstrated this in several Shadow Synods in Rome.  

It has described Hans Küng as the spiritual father of initiatives that led to the founding of We Are Church.

Organization 

The association is composed of groups in various countries and does not accept individual members. A list of its national Media Contacts, with e-mail addresses and in some cases telephone numbers, is given on its website.

Objectives 
Proclaimed in Rome in 12 October 1997, the collaborative developed a manifesto in 1997.  It states, Here in Rome, 35 years ago, Pope John XXIII opened the Second Vatican Council. Catholics throughout the world have put great hope on this event : that might result a more credible church - free, collegial, poor, and a servant.

We need a Church of love, where all are accepted equally.
We need a catholic [i.e. universal ] Church, where each person is welcome with his/her life experiences, images of God and longing for community.
We need a Church that affirms God's creation, that acts in a reconciling manner and reflects the unconditional love of Jesus Christ for all humankind.
We need a Church committed to justice and peace, and which puts solidarity with the excluded of the world at the centre of its action.
In the certainty that God's Spirit leads her /his Church on new ways, millions of Christians have supported the Kirchenvolks- Begehren. [i.e. Petition, Declaration, Referendum, etc.]

They signed the five demands :

The building of a Church of brothers and sisters that recognizes the equality of all the baptized, including the inclusion of the People of God in the election of bishops in their local churches.
Equal rights for men and women, including the admission of women to all Church ministries.
Free choice of either a celibate or married life for all those who dedicate themselves to the service of the church.
A positive attitude toward sexuality, and a recognition of personal conscience in decision -making.
A message of joy and not condemnation, including dialogue, freedom of speech and thought. No anathemas and no exclusion as a means of solving problems, especially as this applies to theologians.
We stand here for all these people. We speak in their name and we declare that we will continue our journey within the Catholic Church.

We have a dream that the Third Millennium will begin with a truly ecumenical Council of all Christian Churches, which will regard each other as equals in their search for peace and friendship among themselves. This will be a Council marked by dialogue and respect for all religions - at the service of the world.

We support the call of the World Council of Churches to launch, in the year 2000, a process leading to a truly universal Council.

Copyright © 1996 - 2021
We Are Church International
Association Loi

Initiatives 

On 4 June 2008, in response to a decree of the Congregation for the Doctrine of the Faith that declared subject to an excommunication whose lifting was reserved to the Holy See anyone who attempted to confer holy orders on a woman, the international movement issued a statement under the heading, "Jesus Christ did not ordain men or women to the ministerial priesthood but to care for and nurture each other as brothers and sisters". In July of the same year, it congratulated the "Anglican Church" for its intention to consecrate women as bishops and declared its regret at "the unchristian attitude of the Vatican establishment which, once again, usurping its mission, has come out in criticism of our Anglican brothers and sisters over the decision".

In 2017  the association supported blessing of same-sex marriages.

Excommunication of a foundress 
On 22 March 2014, the Tiroler Tageszeitung published an interview with Martha Heizer, chairperson and co-founder of the international movement, and her husband, in which they stated that they had been informed that, in line with canon 1378 §2, they were excommunicated on account of their priestless "private Eucharistic celebrations".

See also
 Church 2011
 Association of Catholic Priests - a voluntary association of Roman Catholic clergy in Ireland
 Eighth of May Movement - a somewhat similar movement in the Netherlands that was disbanded in 2003.

References

External links
Official website

Catholic dissident organizations
Catholic lay organisations
Organizations established in 1996
Ordination of women and the Catholic Church